Idiopathic granulomatous hepatitis is a rare medical condition characterised by granulomas in the liver, recurrent fever, myalgia, and fatigue. The condition is not a true hepatitis, and some experts believe it is a variant of sarcoidosis.

References

Ailments of unknown cause
Abdominal pain
Rare diseases
Monocyte- and macrophage-related cutaneous conditions
Autoimmune diseases